Stig Svante Stockselius (born 31 December 1955) is a Swedish journalist and television executive. He was the executive supervisor of the Eurovision Song Contest from 2004 to 2010 and the Junior Eurovision Song Contest from 2003 to 2010.

Early life and career
Svante Stockselius grew up in Ockelbo, a small town in central Sweden. He started his career as a journalist. For 16 years, he worked for the Stockholm-based evening newspaper Expressen.

As head of the entertainment division of the Swedish public service television company Sveriges Television from the late 1990s, he worked with the 2000 Eurovision Song Contest, held in Stockholm. He was also the architect of a major revamp of the Swedish ESC qualification competition, Melodifestivalen, in 2002, introducing four semi-finals and a Second Chance round preceding the finals.

After Estonia's ESC victory in 2001, Stockselius was asked by the Estonian television channel ETV to take part in the preparations for the 2002 event. In 2002 he went on to work for the commercial Swedish television channel TV4. In 2003 he was offered the job as ESC Executive Supervisor. It was announced on 30 August 2010 that he would be resigning after the Junior Eurovision Song Contest 2010 to "give others the opportunity to take the event to the next level". In November 2010, Norwegian television executive Jon Ola Sand was appointed the new executive supervisor of the ESC.

References

External links
 Interview with Svante Stockselius on esctoday.com (2006)
 "Svante Stockselius är chef för hela ESC" - Interview with Finnish television company YLE (2007)

1955 births
Living people
People from Hudiksvall Municipality
Swedish journalists
Television executives
Melodifestivalen
Eurovision Song Contest people